Cranfield University is a British postgraduate public research university specialising in science, engineering, design, technology and management. Cranfield was founded as the College of Aeronautics (CoA) in 1946. Through the 1950s and 1960s, the development of aircraft research led to growth and diversification into other areas such as manufacturing and management, and in 1967, to the founding of the Cranfield School of Management. In 1969, the College of Aeronautics was renamed the Cranfield Institute of Technology, was incorporated by royal charter, gained degree awarding powers, and became a university.  In 1993, it adopted its current name.

Cranfield University has two campuses: the main campus is at Cranfield, Bedfordshire, and the second is at the Defence Academy of the United Kingdom at Shrivenham, southwest Oxfordshire. The main campus is unique in the United Kingdom (and Europe) for having its own airportCranfield Airport and its own aircraft, used for teaching and research.

History

College of Aeronautics (1946–1969)
Cranfield University was formed in 1946 as the College of Aeronautics, on the then Royal Air Force base of RAF Cranfield. A major role was played in the development of the college by Roxbee Cox, later Lord Kings Norton, who was appointed to be the first governor of the college in 1945 and then served as vice-chair and (from 1962) chair of the board. He led the drive for the college to diversify, with the Cranfield University School of Management being established in 1967, and petitioned successfully for a royal charter and degree awarding powers. When these were granted in 1969, he became the first chancellor of the Cranfield Institute of Technology, serving until 1997.

Cranfield Institute of Technology (1969–1993)
The Cranfield Institute of Technology was incorporated by royal charter in 1969, giving the institution its own degree-awarding powers and making it a full university in its own right.

In 1975 the National College of Agricultural Engineering, founded in 1963 at Silsoe, Bedfordshire, was merged with Cranfield and run as Silsoe College.

An academic partnership with the Royal Military College of Science (RMCS) at Shrivenham was formed in 1984. RMCS, whose roots can be traced back to 1772, is now a part of the Defence Academy of the United Kingdom and from 2009 has been known as "Cranfield Defence and Security". RMCS became wholly postgraduate in c.2007 with undergraduate courses moved elsewhere.

Cranfield University (1993–present) 
In 1993 the institution's royal charter was amended changing its name to Cranfield University. A decade later in 2003, Cranfield became wholly postgraduate and the Shrivenham site admitted its last undergraduates.

In 2007, the university's first international campus was opened by the Prince Edward, Duke of Kent, located in the Torrens Building in Adelaide, alongside the Carnegie Mellon University. It offered short-term postgraduate degrees in defence management and technology, in partnership with local institutions and using some distance learning courses. However South Australia's "defence boom" did not materialise and its failure to attract enough students caused the closure of the campus in 2010.

In 2009 Silsoe College was closed and its activities were relocated to the main campus at Cranfield.

Location and campus 

The Cranfield campus sits within the Cambridge – Milton Keynes – Oxford corridor where there are plans to link these cities and stimulate economic growth. There is also a proposal for a rapid transit system between (an expanding) Milton Keynes and the campus, although this is still at an early concept stage.

Technology Park 
There are a number of companies located on the Cranfield University Technology Park ranging from large international companies to small start-ups. Major companies on the park include:
 The Nissan Technical Centre Europe, which designs and develops cars for the European market. The NTC Europe facility occupies  of the Technology Park, representing an investment of £46m by Nissan.
Innovation Centre: the Technology Park is also the location for a large number of smaller companies.

Prior to 2016:
 Trafficmaster plc occupied a  site for its European Headquarters. A leading company in telematics, Trafficmaster's advanced technology enables cars and roads to be used more efficiently.

Milton Keynes
           
Cranfield University is the academic partner in project with Milton Keynes City Council to establish a new university, code-named MK:U, in nearby Milton Keynes. The plan anticipates opening by 2023, with a campus in Central Milton Keynes. In January 2019, the partners announced an international competition to design a new campus near the Central railway station. In May 2019, Santander Bank announced a 'seed funding' grant of £30 million to help with building and initial running costs. On 4 July 2019, the shortlisted proposals for the campus were announced. On 30 July 2019, the evaluation panel announced that Hopkins Architects had produced the winning design.

, the project is stalled following a government decision to deny funding.

Coat of arms

The university's coat of arms reflects a number of key aspects of its heritage. The ‘bars undy wavy’ in chief of the shield are intended in combination with the cranes to allude to the university's name, Cranfield, which etymologically derives from ‘cranuc-feld’, meaning a field frequented by Cranes. The three-branched torch in the base refers to learning and knowledge in the sciences of Engineering, Technology and Management.

In the crest, the astral crown alludes to the College of Aeronautics and also commemorates The Lord Kings Norton as chancellor, having regard to his contribution to the development of aeronautical research and his links with the college. The keys are intended to signify the gaining of knowledge by study and instruction and the owl, with its wings expanded, may also be taken to represent knowledge in the widest sense.

In the badge, the significance of the keys has already been alluded to and the crown rayonny refers both to the royal charter under which Cranfield came into being and, by the finials being composed of the rays of the sun, to energy and its application through engineering and technological skills to industry, commerce and public life.

The chain which surrounds the badge shows the link between the various disciplines to be studied at the university and in itself also refers to engineering where it plays so many parts.

The compartment upon which the cranes stand represents the area of riverside where cranes are likely to be found, this being of course in reference also to the name ‘Cranfield’.

The university's motto, post nubes lux, means 'after clouds light'. It is depicted on the university coat of arms which was introduced when the university was awarded its royal charter.

Organisation and governance

Chancellors 
 1969–1997: Harold Roxbee Cox, Lord Kings Norton
 1998–2010: Richard Vincent, Lord Vincent of Coleshill
 2010–2020: Baroness Young of Old Scone
2021–present: Dame Deirdre Hutton

Vice-chancellors 
 1970–1989: Henry Chilver, Lord Chilver
 1989–2006: Frank Robinson Hartley
 2006–2012: Sir John (James) O'Reilly
 2013: Clifford Michael Friend – interim vice-chancellor
 2013–2021: Sir Peter Gregson
2021–present: Karen Holford

Schools 
The academic schools are:
 School of Aerospace, Transport and Manufacturing, known as SATM, incorporating the original College of Aeronautics, has a wide range of experimental research facilities for masters and doctoral students and commercial clients;
 School of Water, Energy, Environment and Agrifood, known as SWEE and Agrifood (Including Design);
 School of Management, known as SoM;
 Cranfield Defence and Security, known as CDS.

Academic disciplines 

Cranfield University's specialist areas of focus, or Cranfield themes, aims to bring a range of academic disciplines together in order to tackle the grand challenges facing the world within a range of industrial and commercial sectors. These are Water, Agrifood, Energy and Power, Aerospace, Manufacturing, Transport Systems, Defence and Security and Business/Management.

Within Cranfield University's postgraduate environment, the academic disciplines work closely together, blending as they do in the commercial world and industry to deliver real world solutions.

 Aeronautical engineering 
 Automotive engineering 
 Agriculture and agrifood 
 Applied Artificial Intelligence
 Automation and control systems 
 Business and management 
 Chemical engineering 
 Civil engineering 
 Clean energy 
 Computer sciences 
 Cyber Security 
 Design and innovation 
 Ecology and sustainability 
 Economics and finance 
 Electrical and electronic engineering 
 Energy and power 
 Engineering 
 Environmental sciences
 Forensic Science 
 Geography 
 Geosciences 
 Instruments and instrumentation 
 Design and innovation
 Design Thinking 
 Engineering photonics
 International relations 
 Life sciences 
 Manufacturing engineering 
 Materials sciences and engineering 
 Mathematics and statistics 
 Mechanical engineering 
 Mechanics 
 Meteorology and atmospheric sciences 
 Military sciences 
 Physics 
 Plant and soil science 
 Psychology 
 Renewable energy 
 Robotics 
 Safety and Accident Investigation 
 Social sciences 
 Systems sciences 
 Transportation science and technology 
 Water sciences

Academic profile

Reputation and rankings 
As an exclusively postgraduate university, Cranfield University is excluded from the Times Higher Education World University Rankings, The Times World Rankings, The Complete University Guide and The Guardian, which focuses on helping prospective undergraduate students to compare universities. As the university is postgraduate, direct comparison with undergraduate institutions is difficult. Some key facts and figures are:

Cranfield University is in the top 1% of institutions in the world for alumni who hold CEO positions at the world's top companies, according to the Centre for World University Rankings, 2017.
 Cranfield School of Management's full-time one-year MBA programme was named 7th in the world and 1st in the UK and its MSc in Finance and Management was named 6th in the world and 2nd in the UK by the Times Higher Education/Wall Street Journal in 2018.
 Cranfield School of Management ranked 34th in the Financial Times European Business School Rankings 2021 and 80th in the 2018 THE global business and economics rankings.
Cranfield University ranked 27th in the world and 5th in the UK for mechanical, aeronautical and manufacturing engineering in the 2022 QS World University Rankings. 
Cranfield University is ranked 9th in UK in the 2014 Research Excellence Framework (REF) for Aeronautical, Mechanical, Chemical and Manufacturing engineering. It is ranked 2nd in terms of Research Power, and 6th in terms of research Output Quality with 81% achieving 3*-4* research activity.
 Cranfield has received the Queen's Anniversary Prize six times: in 2005 for Further and Higher Education for the Fellowship in Manufacturing Management (FMM) programme; in 2007 for its role in humanitarian demining; in 2011 for contribution to aviation safety through research and training in accident investigation; in 2015 for its work in water and sanitation; in 2017 for its research and education in large-scale soil and environmental data for the sustainable use of natural resources. and in 2019 for the work of the National Flying Laboratory Centre;
 Students on Cranfield's Global Security programme were awarded the Imbert Prize in 2006, 2008 and 2009 for the development of ideas for the advancement of risk and security management in the UK.

Admissions

In 2015/16, 49% of Cranfield University's students were from the United Kingdom, 25% from Europe and 26% from the rest of the world. Cranfield University's student to staff ratio is 5:1, second among all UK universities.

More than half of Cranfield University's students are over 30 years of age.

Partnerships

Cranfield University has links with business, industry and governments. Cranfield University has mutually beneficial relationships with nearly 1,500 organisations around the world including small owner-managed SMEs to large multinational conglomerates; British and international universities, non-government organisations and governments. Some of Cranfield's close partnerships include Airbus, Rolls-Royce Group, Grant Thornton, BAE Systems, Boeing, Lockheed Martin, Ford, BP, British Airways, PWC, Jacobs, Metro Bank, L'Oréal, Royal Dutch Shell, Jaguar Land Rover, Oracle Corporation, PepsiCo, Unilever, to name just a few.

Cranfield University has links with more than 130 universities in the Americas, Asia and Oceania, Europe, Middle East and Africa. The university collaborates with the Singapore University of Social Sciences (SUSS) on SUSS's BEng Aerospace Systems.

The IMRC – Innovative Manufacturing Research Centre at Cranfield University is a project funded by the EPSRC (Engineering and Physical Sciences Research Council) undertaking research that addresses issues identified in the UK government's High Value Manufacturing strategy.

Student life 

Facilities at the Cranfield University campus include a sports centre, which incorporates a fitness centre and aerobics studio, playing fields, sports pitches and several tennis courts. On campus there are two small shops, one run by the CSA and one by Budgens. There are a limited range of eateries open during mealtimes, two Costa Coffee outlets, and one bar, also run by the CSA, which is open intermittently Monday to Friday.

Students' union
Cranfield Students Association (CSA) is the students' union and runs the main student bar, cafe and shop on the Cranfield campus. It is based in building 114 close to the centre of the campus.

The CSA is run by a team of elected students and supported by a small team of staff. The aim of the CSA is to support and represent Cranfield University students, promote student welfare and organise social, cultural and sporting activities.

Student accommodation

At the Cranfield University campus there are a wide range of accommodation options for full-time students, from halls of residence to shared houses, apartments for couples and houses for families.

For part-time students, there are two options available – the 186-room Cranfield Management Development Centre and the 114-room Mitchell Hall, both of which are situated on campus.

Notable alumni 

Cranfield University has a number of notable academic staff and alumni, including politicians, business people, entrepreneurs, engineers, scientists, authors, and TV personalities.

Cranfield University is in the top 1% of institutions in the world for alumni who hold CEO positions at the world's top companies according to the Centre for World University Rankings, 2017.

 Nader Al-Dahabi - Former prime minister of Jordan
 Akinwunmi Ambode - Former Governor Lagos State, Nigeria
 Michael Bear (Lord Mayor) - The 683rd Lord Mayor of London
 Karan Bilimoria – Founder and chairman, Cobra Beer Ltd
 Crispin Blunt – Member of Parliament for Reigate
 Andy Bond – Former CEO, Asda
 Clifford Braimah - Managing Director Ghana Water Company Limited
 Winnie Byanyima - Executive director of Oxfam International
 L. J. Clancy – author of Aerodynamics (1975)
 Nigel Doughty - Former co-chairman and co-founder of Doughty Hanson & Co
 Warren East – CEO, Rolls-Royce Holdings
 Andy Harrison – Former CEO, Whitbread
 Jack Hathaway - Astronaut, one of the 10 candidates selected in the 2021 NASA Astronaut Group 23.
 John Hull – Professor of Derivatives and Risk Management at the University of Toronto
 Antony Jenkins – former Group Chief Executive, Barclays
 Nick Jenkins – Founder of online greetings card retailer Moonpig, former "dragon" on the BBC Two business series Dragons' Den
 Stathis Kefallonitis – neuroscientist and professor at Embry-Riddle Aeronautical University
 Brian Norton – solar energy technologist, President, Dublin Institute of Technology
 Siddhartha Lal - chief executive officer and managing director of Eicher Motors, and chairman and managing director of VE Commercial Vehicles
 Martin Lamb – chief executive, IMI plc
 Samer Majali - CEO / President of Royal Jordanian airlines
 Charlie Mayfield – chairman, John Lewis Partnership
 John McFarlane – executive chairman, Barclays
 Lara Morgan – founder, Company Shortcuts
 Ashitey Trebi-Ollennu - robotics engineer at NASA
 Juan Rafael Elvira Quesada - Served as Secretary of the Environment and Natural Resources
 Andy Palmer - Former CEO, Aston Martin
 Haslina Taib - CEO  Dynamik Technologies, Brunei
 Ted Tuppen – CEO, Enterprise Inns Plc
 James Vowles - team principal at Williams Racing Formula 1 team
 Sarah Willingham – entrepreneur and former "dragon" on the BBC Two business series Dragons' Den
 Balakrishnan Suresh - Air Marshal and Chief of WAC in Indian Air Force

Gallery

See also 
 Academics of Cranfield University
 Armorial of UK universities
 Cranfield Institute
 Cranfield experiments
 Facility for Airborne Atmospheric Measurements
 List of UK universities
 Royal School of Military Survey

References

Further reading

External links 

 Cranfield University website
Cranfield Technology Park
Cranfield Students Association

 
Educational institutions established in 1946
1946 establishments in the United Kingdom
Educational institutions established in 1969
1969 establishments in England
Aviation schools
Universities UK
University